Trachoma papuanum, commonly known as the yellow spectral orchid, is an epiphytic or lithophytic clump-forming orchid with a between three and six thick, fleshy leaves and many dull yellow flowers with a white labellum opening in groups of up to four. This orchid occurs in New Guinea, Queensland and some islands in the South Pacific.

Description
Up to four flowers are open at the same time. Flowering occurs from February to April.

Taxonomy and naming
The yellow spectral orchid was first formally described in 1913 by Rudolf Schlechter who gave it the name Saccolabium papuanum and published the description in Repertorium Specierum Novarum Regni Vegetabilis Beihefte. In 1989 Mark Clements, Jeffrey Wood and David Jones changed the name to Trachoma pupuanum. The specific epithet (papuanum) refers to the type location, the ending -anum a Latin suffix meaning "pertaining to" or "belonging to".

Distribution and habitat
Trachoma papuanum grows on rainforest trees often on branches over streams and in other humid places. It is found in New Guinea, the Solomon Islands, Fiji, Niue, New Caledonia, Vanuatu, the Cook Islands, the Society Islands, Tubuai and Queensland where it grows between Cairns and Innisfail.

References

papuanum
Orchids of Australia
Orchids of New Guinea
Orchids of Vanuatu
Orchids of New Caledonia
Orchids of the Solomon Islands
Plants described in 1913